The 2009 Ritro Slovak Open was a professional tennis tournament played on indoor hard courts. It was the tenth edition of the tournament which was part of Tretorn Serie+ of the 2009 ATP Challenger Tour. It took place in Bratislava, Slovakia between 16 and 22 November 2009.

ATP entrants

Seeds

 Rankings are as of November 9, 2009.

Other entrants
The following players received wildcards into the singles main draw:
  Kamil Čapkovič
  Filip Horanský
  Jerzy Janowicz
  Andrej Martin

The following player received a Special Exempt into the singles main draw:
  Tobias Kamke

The following players received entry from the qualifying draw:
  Rameez Junaid
  Ivo Klec
  Jan Minář
  Juho Paukku
  Michał Przysiężny (LL)
  Marek Semjan (LL)

Champions

Singles

 Michael Berrer def.  Dominik Hrbatý, 6–7(6), 6–4, 7–6(3)

Doubles

 Philipp Marx /  Igor Zelenay def.  Leoš Friedl /  David Škoch, 6–4, 6–4

External links
Official website
ITF Search 
2009 Draws

Ritro Slovak Open
Tatra Banka Slovak Open
Tatra Banka Slovak Open
Slovak Open